Birak, also rendered as Biraq, may refer to:
 Biraq, Fars
 Birak-e Olya, North Khorasan Province, Iran
 Birak-e Sofla, North Khorasan Province, Iran
 Brak, Libya